Parakh Madan is an Indian film and television actress who appeared in Hindi films such as Dev.D  (2009) and Jai Santoshi Maa (2006). She is the wife of Lt Col Adhiraj Singh.

Career
She started her television career with the television series Saathii Re (2006-2007), where she played the female lead. Subsequently, she worked in Burey Bhi Hum Bhale Bhi Hum (2009) (Star Plus), she worked in crime show Monica Mogre (2009), and Piya Ka Ghar (Sahara One).

In 2012, she bagged the role of Hary in Sony TV's Bade Acche Lagte Hain. From 2012 to 2013, she played the role of Natasha Amber Shastri in Sahara One's Rishton Ke Bhanwar Mein Uljhi Niyati. In 2013, she joined the cast of Life OK's Savdhaan India. In 2014, she appeared in Life OK's Tumhari Paakhi as Suman Saxena. In the same year, she played the role Bindiya in Zee TV's Sapne Suhane Ladakpan Ke. In 2015, she portrayed Nivedita Luthra in Life OK's Kalash - Ek Vishwaas. She quit the show in April 2016.

In 2020, she returned to TV after 4 years with Zee TV's Qurbaan Hua as Gazala Rahil Baig. In 2022, she appeared as Masoom in Zee TV's Meet: Badlegi Duniya Ki Reet.

Filmography

Films

Television

References

External links
 

Actresses in Hindi cinema
Living people
Indian television actresses
Year of birth missing (living people)